The St-Légier–Châtel-St-Denis railway line was a  railway line in the cantons of Vaud and Fribourg, Switzerland. The line was owned and operated by the Chemins de fer électriques Veveysans (CEV). It opened in 1904 and was closed in 1969.

History 

In Châtel-St-Denis the line joined with that of the Chemin de fer Châtel-St-Denis–Palézieux (CP). The CEV closed this branch line on 31 May 1969. In 2019, the lines at Châtel-St-Denis were rebuilt to permit through operation without a turnaround, and a new station was built slightly to the west of the original location.

Notes

References 
 

Closed railway lines in Switzerland
Metre gauge railways in Switzerland
Transport in the canton of Fribourg
Transport in the canton of Vaud
Railway lines opened in 1902
Railway lines closed in 1969
900 V DC railway electrification